Vietnam: A Television History (1983) is a 13-part documentary and television mini-series about the Vietnam War (1955–1975) from the perspective of the United States. It was produced for public television by WGBH-TV in Boston, Central Independent Television of the UK and Antenne-2 of France. It was originally broadcast on PBS between October 4 and December 20, 1983.

Later, it was rebroadcast as part of the PBS series American Experience from May 26 to July 28, 1997. However, only 11 of the 13 original episodes were rebroadcast. Episodes 2 and 13 were dropped.

Vietnam: A Television History was the most successful documentary produced by PBS up to the time of initial broadcast. Nearly 9% of American households watched the initial episode, and an average of 9.7 million viewers watched each of the 13 episodes. A rebroadcast in the summer of 1984 garnered roughly a 4% share in the five largest U.S. television markets.

Production
The origins of the series reach back to 1977 when filmmaker Richard Ellison and foreign correspondent Stanley Karnow discussed the project. The latter had been a journalist in Paris during the 1950s and a reporter in French Indochina since 1959. Karnow was Chief Correspondent in the series and his tie-in book, Vietnam: A History (1983), became a best-seller.

Episodes

Edited 1997 version

When PBS elected to rebroadcast Vietnam: A Television History (originally broadcast in 1983) as part of its American Experience series in 1997, a re-edited version some 120 minutes shorter (a total of 660 minutes, as opposed to 780 minutes) was used. this version excluded entirely Episodes 2 ("The First Vietnam War") and 13 ("Legacies") of the original broadcast.

The editing was reportedly undertaken to remove outdated information and to create a more cohesive story for viewers. However, some viewers who remembered the original 13-episode version denigrated the changes as "censorship": they believed that they could detect a "corrective" treatment of the material that involved cutting out politically objectionable scenes; an interview of a French captain discussing the end of the siege at Dien Bien Phu and referring to the Viet Minh as "Red Termites"; an interview of a man recalling a popular expression of that time and place in which the native plantation workers were termed "fertilizer" because so many died and were buried beneath the trees among which they toiled; and material depicting the British decision to rearm defeated Japanese soldiers at the end of World War II to use them against the Vietnamese.
No evidence was presented that PBS executives edited the series for political purposes.

Additionally, the use of the shortened 1997 broadcast version for the 2004 DVD release of the series–rather than the entire, original 1983 version–has not been explained.

Reception

Critical response
The New York Times described the series as "determinedly even-handed" and "delicately balanced"; it concluded that the production was "a landmark in television journalism". It observed that "the documentary implies that the peace movement, unsupported by most Americans, had little effect on the conduct of the war. Indeed, by attacking Hubert H. Humphrey, it probably elected Richard M. Nixon. This seems to have been its most significant contribution to American history... In a curious way, the documentary also suggests that American hawks and doves were right and wrong in equal measure." The critic, however, took the filmmakers to task for some "weaknesses in the reportorial technique." The film also received very positive reviews from The Washington Post, Variety, Time, and Newsweek. The latter two hailed the series as fair, brilliant, and objective.

The series aired in the UK to good reviews, but did not receive the high ratings achieved in the U.S.

Criticism
The film Television's Vietnam: The Real Story (1985), aired on the PBS network as a rebuttal to the documentary.  It was narrated by Charlton Heston and produced by Accuracy in Media.

See also
Vietnam: The Ten Thousand Day War, a 1980 Canadian television documentary about the Vietnam War which was produced by Michael Maclear
The Vietnam War (TV series), a 2017 documentary series which was also produced by PBS

References

Further reading
Banerian, James, editor. "Losers Are Pirates: A Close Look At The PBS Series "Vietnam: A Television History."" Phoenix, Arizona: Sphinx, 1985.
Karnow, Stanley. (1983; 2nd edition, 1997), Vietnam: A History. Middlesex, England: Penguin.
Lichty, Lawrence. "Vietnam: A Television History: Media Research And Some Comments." In, Rosenthal, Alan, editor. New Challenges For Documentary. Berkeley: University of California Press, 1988.
Springer, Claudia. Vietnam: A Television History And The Equivocal Nature of Objectivity, Wide Angle (Athens, Ohio), 1985.

External links
Official PBS website

WGBH Educational Foundation Vietnam Project records, 1946-1985 at Joseph P. Healey Library, University of Massachusetts Boston

1983 television films
1983 films
American Experience
Documentary films about the Vietnam War
Documentary television series about the Cold War
1983 American television series debuts
1983 American television series endings
PBS original programming
Television series by WGBH
Television shows produced by Central Independent Television
France Télévisions original programming